"One of Them Girls" is a song recorded by American country music singer Lee Brice. It is the lead single from his fifth studio album Hey World. Brice wrote the song with Ashley Gorley, Dallas Davidson, and Ben Johnson. It is the highest-charting song of his career on the Billboard Hot 100, peaking at #17.

History
Tricia Desperes of Taste of Country described the song as "a summer-tinged song that tells of strong, confident girls who hold their hearts up as an armor of sorts, waiting for the right person who can take down their guard." Brice called co-writers Ashley Gorley, Dallas Davidson, and Ben Johnson the night before a songwriting session and presented them with the idea for the song; they finished it overnight and recorded it the next day. Brice released the single in early 2020 as the lead to his upcoming fifth studio album, and following on the success of his duet with Carly Pearce, "I Hope You're Happy Now".

The music video features a woman who is struggling to raise her daughter, and then ends up rescuing a man trapped inside his car.

Charts

Weekly charts

Year-end charts

Certifications

References

2020 singles
2020 songs
Curb Records singles
Lee Brice songs
Songs written by Lee Brice
Songs written by Dallas Davidson
Songs written by Ashley Gorley